The ABC Under-18 Championship for Women 1998 is the 14th edition of the ABC's junior championship for basketball. The games were held at Tokushima, Japan from September 13–20, 1998.

Preliminary round

Group A

Group B

Classification 5th–12th

11th place

9th place

7th place

5th place

Final round

Semifinals

3rd place

Final

Final standing

Awards

References
FIBA Archive

1998
1998 in women's basketball
1998–99 in Asian basketball
1998 in Japanese sport
International women's basketball competitions hosted by Japan
1998 in youth sport